Glyphipterix grapholithoides is a moth in the family Glyphipterigidae. It is known from South Africa.

References

Endemic moths of South Africa
Glyphipterigidae
Moths of Africa
Moths described in 1891